Hilda May Binns (née Torok, later Longmate ; Born 20 October 1945, died 4 August 2022 ) is a Canadian former Paralympic athlete who competed in athletics and swimming events.

Biography 
Binns was born in Hamilton, Ontario In 1945 and contracted polio in 1955. Her father built her an exercise bike to help her rehabilitation.

Binns won two gold medals at the 1968 Summer Paralympics, held in Tel Aviv. 

She was a founder of Steel City Wheelers, and involved with the Hamilton Post Polio Association and the Hamilton Handicapped Club. 

Hilda May Torok married fellow polio survivor and athlete David Binns by 1973.

Honors 
She was inducted into the Hamilton Gallery of Distinction in 2018, and into the Hamilton Sports Hall of Fame in 2019.

References 
 

1945 births
Living people
Medalists at the 1968 Summer Paralympics
Medalists at the 1972 Summer Paralympics
Paralympic medalists in swimming
Paralympic medalists in athletics (track and field)
Paralympic gold medalists for Canada
Paralympic silver medalists for Canada
Paralympic bronze medalists for Canada
Athletes from Hamilton, Ontario
Swimmers at the 1968 Summer Paralympics
Athletes (track and field) at the 1972 Summer Paralympics
Paralympic swimmers of Canada
Paralympic track and field athletes of Canada
Canadian female swimmers
Canadian female wheelchair racers